Raúl Hardy (born 25 January 1976) is a Cuban handball player. He competed in the men's tournament at the 2000 Summer Olympics.

References

1976 births
Living people
Cuban male handball players
Olympic handball players of Cuba
Handball players at the 2000 Summer Olympics
Place of birth missing (living people)